Bis or BIS may refer to:

 bis, a Latin word meaning 'twice'

Arts and entertainment

Music 
 BIS Records, a Swedish record label 
 , a Cuban record label
 Bis (Scottish band), a Scottish Indie pop band
 Bis (Japanese rock band)
 Bis (Japanese idol group)

Other uses in arts and entertainment
 Mario & Luigi: Bowser's Inside Story, a 2009 video game for the Nintendo DS
 Bis (film), a 2015 French comedy film
 Bis (magazine), a Japanese fashion magazine 
 , a French TV station
 Bis, a Brazilian pay TV channel of Canais Globo

Businesses and organizations
 Bank for International Settlements, an international financial institution
 Benevolent Irish Society, a Canadian philanthropic organization
 Bezpečnostní informační služba, the Czech Security Information Service
 BIS hallmark, a jewellery hallmarking in India
 Bloque Institucional Social Démocrata, a political party of the Dominican Republic
 Bohemia Interactive Studio, a Czech video game developer
 British Ice Skating, a British sports body
 British Interlingua Society, a British society 
 British Interplanetary Society, a British space advocacy society
 Bureau of Indian Standards, a national standards body 
 Bureau of Industry and Security, an agency of the United States Department of Commerce
 Department for Business, Innovation and Skills, a former British government department
 British Information Services, a British government propaganda organization

Education
 Bachelor of Independent Studies, or Bachelor of Interdisciplinary Studies, an undergraduate degree
 Bachelor of Integrated Studies, an undergraduate degree
 Bavarian International School, in Germany
 Bordeaux International School, in France
 Brisbane Independent School, in Australia
 British International School (disambiguation), the name of several schools

Science and technology
 -bis, an IUPAC numerical multiplier for compound or complex features, meaning 2
 Barratt Impulsiveness Scale, in psychology
 Behavioural Inhibition System, a brain-behavioral systems in reinforcement sensitivity theory
 BIS monitor or bispectral index, to assess the depth of anaesthesia
 BlackBerry Internet Service
 Boot Integrity Services, in Preboot Execution Environment specifications
 MAPPER, now known as BIS, is a fourth-generation programming language
 YTJ (Finnish government service), also known as Business Information System

Other uses
 Bislama language (ISO 639 alpha-3 code bis)
 Bisj pole, or Bis pole, is a ritual artifact of the Asmat people of New Guinea
 Bismarck Municipal Airport, North Dakota, U.S., IATA code and FAA LID: BIS

See also

 Bice, from the French bis, a green or blue pigment